KDE Platform 4 was a collection of libraries and software frameworks by KDE that served as technological foundation for KDE Software Compilation 4 distributed under the GNU Lesser General Public License (LGPL). KDE Platform 4 was the successor to KDElibs and the predecessor of KDE Frameworks. KDE Platform 4 is the only version of KDE Platform, and in 2013 it was replaced by KDE Frameworks 5.

Technologies 
 User Interface
 Plasma – desktop and panel widget engine
 KHTML – HTML rendering engine
 KIO – extensible network-transparent file access
 KParts – lightweight in-process graphical component framework
 Sonnet – spell checker
 XMLGUI – allows defining UI elements such as menus and toolbars via XML files
 Goya
 Hardware and Multimedia
 Phonon – multimedia framework
 Solid – device integration framework
 Services
 NEPOMUK
 KNewStuff – KDE's "Hot New Stuff" classes
 Policykit-KDE
 Communication
 Akonadi
 Games
 Gluon
 KGGZ
 Other
ThreadWeaver – library to use multiprocessor systems more effectively
 Kiosk – allows disabling features within KDE to create a more controlled environment
 Kross
 KConfig XT
WebDAV

Technologies superseded in KDE Platform 4 
 aRts – sound server (replaced with Phonon)
 DCOP – inter-process communication system (replaced with D-Bus)

KParts 
KParts is the component framework for the KDE Plasma desktop environment. An individual component is called a KPart. KParts are analogous to Bonobo components in GNOME  and ActiveX controls in Microsoft's Component Object Model. Konsole is available as a KPart and is used in applications like Konqueror and Kate.

Example uses of KParts:
 Konqueror uses the Okular part to display documents
 Konqueror uses the Dragon Player part to play multimedia
 Kontact embeds kdepim applications
 Kate and other editors use the katepart editor component
 Several applications use the Konsole KPart to embed a terminal

Solid 
Solid is a device integration framework for KDE Platform 4 and its successor, KDE Frameworks. It functions on similar principles to KDE's multimedia pillar Phonon; rather than managing hardware on its own, it makes existing solutions accessible through a single API. The current solution uses udev, NetworkManager and BlueZ (the official Linux Bluetooth stack). However, any and all parts can be replaced without breaking the application, making applications using Solid extremely flexible and portable. Work is underway to build a Solid backend for the Windows port of KDE based on Windows Management Instrumentation.

References

External links 

 TechBase, documentation for KDE developers
 KDE Projects, overview of all projects within git.kde.org
 KDE quick Git source code browser
 KDE Bug Tracking System
 KDE tutorial first program

 
Application programming interfaces
Articles with example C++ code
Computing platforms
Free computer libraries
KDE software
Unix windowing system-related software
X-based libraries